Jay Myself is a 2018 American documentary film directed by Stephen Wilkes, produced by his wife, Bette Wilkes, and written by Josh Alexander.

Synopsis
The film chronicles the days during which renowned photographer Jay Maisel decides to sell his long-time New York home, the historic six-story former Germania Bank Building on the Bowery, for $55 million dollars. The documentary tells the story of how Maisel obtained this property in 1967. The film starts with Maisel having only five months left until his building will be sold. During these months he is sorting through 72 rooms, showcasing a collection of VHS tapes, special-sized screws, and of course, the photographs for which he was famous.

Cast
Jay Maisel as himself
Stephen Wilkes as himself
Amanda Maisel as herself

Production and screening
The production began with Wilkes, back then a photographer himself, getting acquainted with Maisel in 1979, and soon after becoming his close friend, assistant and mentee. The film was shot in 2015.

Jay Myself premiered at 2018 Doc NYC. It was screened at numerous other film festivals, including the Atlanta Jewish Film Festival, the Cleveland International Film Festival, the Newport Beach Film Festival and OTR Film Festival. It also was screened domestically at the 2019 Milwaukee and at the Sedona Film Festivals.

Reception
On Metacritic, Jay Myself have a rank of 74 out of a 100 based on 8 critics, indicating "generally favorable reviews".

John DeFore of The Hollywood Reporter called Jay Myself "A fascinating look at an artist's life", while Glenn Kenny of The New York Times stated simply "It's a fun journey".

Varietys Owen Gleiberman praised the narration, writing "Wilke[s] views his old mentor with affection, but with a supreme awareness of what a crazy-charismatic crank he can be".

Nick Allen of RogerEbert.com had a different opinion. He wrote: "Whether this is all for the sake of art or not, it can be too nauseating to peer into from the outside".

According to Derek Smith of Slant Magazine, "Jay Maisel's former home suggests a bastion of creativity in a neighborhood whose rough edges have been completely sanded down".

Leah Pickett of Chicago Reader wrote in her closing comments that "[i]n the end, the viewer might find herself both feeling the loss at the center of Maisel and Wilkes's letting-go process and craving a similar grotto of her own".

References

External links

Jay Maisel – Jay Myself – A Documentary
Jay Myself on Oscilloscope

2018 documentary films
American documentary films
Films about photographers
Films set in 2015
2010s English-language films
2010s American films